This is a list of lakes of Burundi.

R
Lake Rweru

T
 Lake Tanganyika

Burundi
Lakes